The Small Aircraft Transportation System (SATS) is a joint research project between the Federal Aviation Administration (FAA) and the National Aeronautics and Space Administration (NASA), along with local airports and aviation authorities. It is designed to facilitate transportation between small General Aviation airports using small aircraft as an alternative to traditional airline travel.

Conception

The terrorist attacks of September 11th caused the Transportation Security Administration (TSA) to dramatically increase security measures. These increases in security multiplied the number of times travelers spent getting through the airport to their gate. After the tourism industry rebounded from the recession caused by the attacks, the higher levels of airport traffic further demonstrated the strain on these new elevated security procedures.

NASA and the FAA saw in General Aviation the cure to the aviation industry's problems. With more than 3,400 small airports in the U.S. alone, a large amount of traffic could be diverted from mass transit airline travel to private, small aircraft General Aviation.

With new technologies proposed by NASA and new logistics, systems, and infrastructure developed by the FAA, the idea was born.

The concept of the Small Aircraft Transportation System (SATS) was first envisioned in the late 1980s in a workshop by the AIAA, NASA, FAA, and industry titled, "The Role of Technology in Revitalizing the U.S. General Aviation Industry." The SATS concept was first articulated by that name in the 1997 presentation by NASA at the Oshkosh Air Venture Convention, "Life After Airliners." The SATS concept emerged from the work of the Advanced General Aviation Transport Experiments (AGATE) Alliance. The AGATE Alliance was a public-private partnership (1994-2001), established by NASA, between government and industry to revitalize the technology deployment capacity for the U.S. General Aviation industry. Based on the technology design guidelines, system standards, and certification standards developed by AGATE, a new generation of personal transportation aircraft was developed by industry from around the world. These new aircraft appear to be economically and operationally viable for use in on-demand transportation fleet operations. The first fleet operators began services in 2005, with increasing numbers of companies starting operations in 2006 and 2007.

Proposed technology
A poor safety record for small aircraft operating from general aviation airports, restricted airspace capacity, and weather complications were seen as the greatest barriers to the expanded use of small aircraft and community airports for public transportation. The SATS Project (2001-2006), conducted by NASA and partners in the National Consortium for Aviation Mobility (NCAM) proved the viability of technical capabilities in the following four areas:
High-volume operations at airports without control towers or terminal radar facilities
Technologies enabling safe landings at more airports in almost all weather conditions
Integration of SATS aircraft into a higher capacity air traffic control system, with complex flows and slower aircraft
Improved single-pilot ability to function competently in evolving, complex national airspace

See also
 Air taxi
 Very light jet
 Compressed air car

References
NASA SATS fact sheet

External links
Evaluating the Efficiency of a Small Aircraft Transportation System Network Using Planning and Simulation Models (2006)
Nationwide Impacts of Very Light Jet Traffic in the Future Next Generation Air Transportation System (NGATS) (2006)
A Transportation Systems Analysis Model (TSAM) to study the impact of the Small Aircraft Transportation System (SATS) (2005)
An Integrated Model To Study The Small Aircraft Transportation System (SATS) (2003)
Small Aircraft Transportation System (SATS) Project Office
Airport Transportation Service
Transportation Systems Analysis Model - TSAM is a nationwide transportation planning model to forecast air taxi demand in the United States.

General aviation
Aviation in the United States
Air navigation